Alexis Jorge Niz (born 15 May 1988) is an Argentine professional footballer who plays as a centre-back for Chaco For Ever.

Career
Niz started off with Atlético de Rafaela in 2006, remaining for nine years whilst scoring two goals in fifty-nine games; his last appearance came against Nueva Chicago on 7 June 2015. During his time with Rafaela, he spent part of 2009 out on loan with Sportivo Rivadavia in Torneo Argentino C but failed to feature. On 6 July 2015, Niz joined Sarmiento of the Argentine Primera División. His Sarmiento debut arrived on 14 August versus Olimpo, which was his only appearance of the 2015 campaign for the club. He subsequently scored two goals in the following two seasons across twenty-nine appearances.

In June 2017, fellow Primera División side Tigre signed Niz following Sarmiento's relegation. He featured in fourteen fixtures in his debut campaign of 2017–18. Niz made the 100th appearance of his senior career in February 2018 versus Atlético Tucumán.

Career statistics
.

Honours
Atlético de Rafaela
Primera B Nacional: 2010–11

References

External links

1988 births
Living people
People from Rafaela
Argentine footballers
Association football defenders
Primera Nacional players
Torneo Argentino C players
Argentine Primera División players
Atlético de Rafaela footballers
Club Atlético Sarmiento footballers
Club Atlético Tigre footballers
Instituto footballers
Chaco For Ever footballers
Sportspeople from Santa Fe Province